Sings His Greatest Hits is a greatest hits collection by country singer Billy "Crash" Craddock. It was released in 1978 on ABC Records as AB-1078. It was reissued as MCA Records 663 in 1981. The album was re-released again on cassette only in 1995. The album has been called "a good summation of his peak years."

Track listing
Rub It In
Broken Down in Tiny Pieces
Another Woman
There Won't Be Another Now
Ruby Baby
Think I'll Go Somewhere (And Cry Myself To Sleep)
Why Don't We Sleep On It
Easy As Pie
Knock Three Times
Walk Softly
Still Thinkin' 'bout You
Don Juan

References

Billy "Crash" Craddock compilation albums
1978 greatest hits albums